Meeker Sugar Refinery is located in Meeker in south Rapides Parish, Louisiana. The refinery was added to the National Register of Historic Places on November 16, 1987.

It was operated by the Klock brothers, Ernest Lorne Klock (1879-1967) and Neil Haven Klock, the latter of whom who served from 1940 to 1944 in the Louisiana House of Representatives as one of the three Rapides Parish members.

References

Industrial buildings and structures on the National Register of Historic Places in Louisiana
Buildings and structures in Rapides Parish, Louisiana
Sugar refineries
National Register of Historic Places in Rapides Parish, Louisiana